The Goodnight-Loving Trail is a song by Utah Phillips about the cattle trail of the same name.  One of the namesakes of the trail, Charles Goodnight is also credited with inventing the chuckwagon.  Lyrics and liner notes  are available from the author's website.

Recordings
  Utah Phillips, Starlight on the Rails
  Ed Trickett Tellin takes Me Home
  Finest Kind Lost in a Song 
  Tom Waits Dime Store Novels Vol. 1
  Ian Tyson Ian Tyson
  Rosalie Sorrels Strangers In Another Country
  Chris LeDoux Songbook of American West
  Swan Arcade Round Again
  Charlie Daniels, Nighthawk (2016)

Pop culture
The song is used as the opening of the h2g2 article on Roswell, New Mexico.

References

American songs
1976 songs
Utah Phillips songs